The Sabbath Collection is a compilation album released in 1985 by the heavy metal band Black Sabbath. The album was released without the consent of the band, and is therefore considered "unofficial". There are some mistakes with the track listing; "Sleeping Village" and "Warning"'s track length listings were inverted, giving Sleeping Village a length of 10:47 and Warning a length of 3:30. There is also a misspelling of "Sabbra Cadabra", indicating the person who wrote the album info was dyslexic, or impaired.

Track listing
 Paranoid - 2:48 (Iommi, Ward, Butler, Osbourne/Westminster Music Ltd.)
 Behind The Wall Of Sleep - 4:20 (Iommi, Ward, Butler, Osbourne/Westminster Music Ltd.)
 Sleeping Village - 3:30 (Iommi, Ward, Butler, Osbourne/Westminster Music Ltd.)
 Warning - 10:47 (Dunbar/Getaway Songs)
 After Forever - 5:25 (Iommi/Westminster Music Ltd.)
 Supernaut - 4:40 (Iommi, Ward, Butler, Osbourne/Westminster Music Ltd.)
 St. Vitus Dance - 2:25 (Iommi, Ward, Butler, Osbourne/Westminster Music Ltd.)
 Snowblind - 5:27 (Iommi, Ward, Butler, Osbourne/Westminster Music Ltd.)
 Killing Yourself To Live - 5:40 (Black Sabbath/Westminster Music Ltd.)
 Sabbra Cadabra - 5:56 (Black Sabbath/Westminster Music Ltd.)* (Spelled "Sabra Cabadra" on back cover of the album.)
 The Writ - 7:46 (Black Sabbath/Westminster Music Ltd.)

Credits
 Songs 1, 2, 3, 4, & 5 produced by Roger Bain for Tony Hall Enterprises
 Songs 6, 7, 8 & 8 produced by Patrick Meehan & Black Sabbath
 Songs 9, & 10 produced by Black Sabbath for Excellency Production
 Song 11 produced by Black Sabbath with Mike Butcher

Sales accomplishments 
BPI certification  (United Kingdom)

See also

References 

Black Sabbath compilation albums
1985 compilation albums